Petra Kvitová defeated the defending champion Jeļena Ostapenko in the final, 6–3, 6–2 to win the women's singles tennis title at the 2022 Eastbourne International. Ostapenko was aiming to be the first woman to defend the Eastbourne title since Justine Henin in 2007.

Seeds 
All seeds received a bye into the second round.

Draw

Finals

Top half

Section 1

Section 2

Bottom half

Section 3

Section 4

Qualifying

Seeds

Qualifiers

Lucky losers

Qualifying draw

First qualifier

Second qualifier

Third qualifier

Fourth qualifier

References

External links 
 Main draw
 Qualifying draw

2022 WTA Tour
2022 Eastbourne International - Women's 1